V-Rally 2 (Need for Speed: V-Rally 2 in North America for the PlayStation version and Test Drive V-Rally in North America for the Dreamcast version) is a racing video game developed by Eden Studios and published by Infogrames for PlayStation, Dreamcast and Microsoft Windows. It was originally planned for release as a Nintendo 64 title, but was cancelled during the early development phases of the game and was never officially announced.

Gameplay
The game features rally cars that competed in the 1999 World Rally Championship season. There are 26 cars in Championship Edition and 27 in Expert Edition. There are over 80 original tracks which represent all of the rallies of the 1999 season, excluding Greece and Safari. The game modes include a time trial mode, an arcade mode which follows the traditional style of arcade games, V-Rally Trophy where the player competes against 3 AI opponents to see who can get the least time in all of the rallies. The championship mode follows the actual example of rallying with different stages in the rallies featured in the game. V-Rally Trophy and Championship Mode feature 3 distinct championships: European, World and Expert.

Weather conditions like snow, rain, and rallying in daytime, sunset and night are included.

The racing tracks are essentially stored as curved lines in 3D space. Instead of designing and storing the entire track environment as a 3D model, the game engine generates each track segment based on the 3D line and several parameters, such as track theme, weather, incline/decline, degree of curvature etc.

There is also a track editor where the player can design their own rally tracks. There is Multiplayer mode which supports up to 4 Players. The PlayStation version of the game features support for DualShock analog controllers and Namco's neGcon and Jogcon racing controllers.

Development
Interviewed by Official Dreamcast Magazine producer Oliver Raffard said that the development team were inspired by "GP1 for the sensation [of driving], the realism and the choice of tunings; Out Run for the fun and arcade spirit; and Rally Masters for the handling".

Reception

The Dreamcast version received "favorable" reviews according to the review aggregation website Metacritic. In Japan, where the PlayStation version was ported for release under the name  and published by Spike on January 27, 2000, Famitsu gave it a score of 27 out of 40.

Max Everingham of NextGen said of the latter console version in its January 2000 issue, "It looks good, it plays fine, and it has a lot of tracks. Only a few annoying quirks keep it from really flying." Ten issues later, however, Jim Preston called the former console version "A colorful, fun, and realistic driving sim."

Edge gave the PlayStation version eight out of ten, saying that it was "Not perfect [...] but certainly closer than most other PlayStation driving games are likely to get." GamePro said that the same console version "walks a fine line of bridging a rally racing sim with arcade fun. The game has some tweaking options available, but mostly it's just about learning the ropes and driving, driving, driving. Easily the top of the class in rally racing games for the home console and not likely to be topped (except maybe graphically by Sega Rally 2 for the Dreamcast)."

Notes

References

External links
 

1999 video games
Dreamcast games
Infogrames games
Cancelled Nintendo 64 games
Multiplayer and single-player video games
Need for Speed games
Off-road racing video games
PlayStation (console) games
Rally racing video games
Spike (company) games
Test Drive
Video games developed in France
Video games set in Argentina
Video games set in Australia
Video games set in Corsica
Video games set in England
Video games set in Finland
Video games set in Indonesia
Video games set in Italy
Video games set in Monaco
Video games set in New Zealand
Video games set in Portugal
Video games set in Spain
Video games set in Sweden
Video games with user-generated gameplay content
Windows games
Eden Games games

de:V-Rally#V-Rally 2